Anything for a Song is a 1943 Italian "white-telephones" musical film directed by Mario Mattoli and starring Ferruccio Tagliavini, Vera Carmi and Luisa Rossi. It was shot at the Palatino Studios in Rome. The film's sets were designed by the art director Piero Filippone.

Cast
 Ferruccio Tagliavini as Il tenore
 Vera Carmi as La fanciulla
 Luisa Rossi as La ragazza cieca
 Carlo Campanini as L'amico del tenore
 Virgilio Riento as L'industriale
 Tino Scotti as Il maestro di musica
 Aldo Silvani as Il padre del tenore
 Luigi Cimara
 Carlo Romano as 
  as 
 Mario Siletti as 
  as 
 Totò Mignone as 
 Lia Orlandini as 
 Emilio Petacci as

References

Bibliography
 Roberto Chiti & Roberto Poppi. I film: Tutti i film italiani dal 1930 al 1944. Gremese Editore, 2005.

External links

1943 films
1943 musical films
1940s Italian-language films
Italian black-and-white films
Films directed by Mario Mattoli
Italian musical films
Films shot at Palatino Studios
1940s Italian films